Wirtz is a crater on Mars, located in Argyre quadrangle at 48.6° south latitude and 26° west longitude. The name was adopted by IAU's Working Group for Planetary System Nomenclature in 1973. Wirtz lies on the eastern edge of the large impact crater Argyre Planitia.

Gallery

See also 
 Asteroid 26074 Carlwirtz
 List of craters on Mars

References

External links 

 Wirtz Crater, Themis – Thermal Emission Imaging System

Argyre quadrangle
Impact craters on Mars